Something New is the third extended play and the fourth overall by South Korean singer Taeyeon. The album was released on June 18, 2018, by SM Entertainment and consists of six tracks including the title track of the same name, "Something New".

Background and release
On June 12, 2018, SM Entertainment announced that Taeyeon's third EP would be released on June 18, 2018. This will mark Taeyeon's first EP released after her last album This Christmas: Winter Is Coming, released in December 2017. On June 14, 2018, the music video teaser for the title track "Something New" was released and has attracted attention for its cinematography.

Track listing
Credits adapted from Naver

Charts

Weekly

Monthly charts

Year-end charts

Release history

References 

2018 EPs
Taeyeon EPs
SM Entertainment EPs
IRiver EPs
Pop music EPs
Rhythm and blues EPs